Aidenas Malašinskas (born 29 April 1986) is a Lithuanian handball player who currently plays for Ukrainian club MT Melsungen and the Lithuania national team.

Was honored as best Lithuanian handball player of 2021.

References

Lithuanian male handball players
Sportspeople from Vilnius
Living people
1986 births
Expatriate handball players
Lithuanian expatriate sportspeople in Ukraine
BM Granollers players
Lithuanian expatriate sportspeople in Spain